Brennen Davis (born November 2, 1999) is an American professional baseball outfielder for the Chicago Cubs of Major League Baseball (MLB). He was selected by the Cubs in the 2018 Major League Baseball draft.

Amateur career
Davis attended Basha High School in Chandler, Arizona, where he played baseball and basketball. He committed to play college baseball at the University of Miami. Following his senior year, he was selected by the Chicago Cubs in the second round of the 2018 Major League Baseball draft. He signed for $1.1 million.

Professional career
Davis made his professional debut with the Rookie-level Arizona League Cubs, hitting .298 over 18 games in 2018. He spent the 2019 season with the South Bend Cubs of the Class A Midwest League, slashing .305/.381/.525 with eight home runs and thirty RBIs over fifty games. He did not play a minor league game in 2020 due to the cancellation of the minor league season caused by the COVID-19 pandemic.

Davis missed part of the 2021 season after he took a pitch to the face in an April spring training game. Once recovered, he was assigned to South Bend before he was promoted to the Tennessee Smokies of the Double-A South on June 1. That same month, Davis was selected to play in the All-Star Futures Game, where he earned MVP honors for his two-homer performance in an 8-3 National League victory. In September, he was promoted to the Iowa Cubs of the Triple-A East. After finishing the season with a .260/.375/.494 slash line, 19 home runs, and 53 RBIs over 99 games across three levels of the minor leagues, Davis was awarded his second Buck O’Neil Cubs Minor League Player of the Year award.

In 2022, he played for three minor league teams. He batted .180/.299/.298, not hitting higher than .192 with any of the three teams. On June 3, 2022, Davis underwent back surgery.

Davis was optioned to the Triple-A Iowa Cubs to begin the 2023 season.

References

External links

African-American baseball players
1999 births
Living people
Arizona League Cubs players
Baseball outfielders
Baseball players from Arizona
Iowa Cubs players
South Bend Cubs players
Sportspeople from Chandler, Arizona
Tennessee Smokies players